Dubrajpur refers to a city in Birbhum district in West Bengal, India
 
It may also refer to:
 Dubrajpur, Paschim Medinipur, a village in Paschim Medinipur district in West Bengal, India